Acts 3 is the third chapter of the Acts of the Apostles in the New Testament of the Christian Bible. The book containing this chapter is anonymous but early Christian tradition affirmed that Luke composed this book as well as the Gospel of Luke. This chapter records the healing of a disabled person by the apostles Peter and John, and Peter's preaching at Solomon's Porch in the Second Temple.

Text
The original text was written in Koine Greek and is divided into 26 verses.

Textual witnesses
Some early manuscripts containing the text of this chapter are:
 Papyrus 91 (3rd century; extant verses 1–2)
 Codex Vaticanus (325–350)
 Codex Sinaiticus (330–360)
 Codex Bezae (~400)
 Codex Alexandrinus (400–440)
 Codex Ephraemi Rescriptus (~450)
 Codex Laudianus (~550)

Old Testament references
 : 
 : ; ;

A lame man healed (3:1–10)
This section gives one detailed account as an example of Luke's earlier note that "the 'apostolic band' has the power to work miracles".

Verse 2
And a certain man lame from his mother's womb was carried, whom they laid daily at the gate of the temple which is called Beautiful, to ask alms of them that entered into the temple.

The temple in Jerusalem had several gates, but it is not clear which one might have been called Beautiful. No ancient source mentions the Beautiful Gate, but the Nicanor Gate is probably the best guess. Traditionally the gate is identified with the Shushan Gate but, according to C. K. Barrett, that gate was not a suitable location for a beggar.

Verse 6
Then Peter said, "Silver and gold have I none; but such as I have give I thee: In the name of Jesus Christ of Nazareth rise up and walk".
The healing of the lame man in this chapter is the inspiration of some songs. One such example is the children's song "Silver and Gold Have I None".

No other name (3:11–26)
These verses record Peter's second speech (after Acts 2), which addresses the same two questions as his first: 'What does this mean?' (cf. 2:12) and 'What shall we do?' (cf. 2:37).

Verse 17

"Ignorance": this is said as one of the "mitigating factors" of rejecting the Messiah; a mistake of both the crowd (whom Peter called 'brethren') and the rulers.

Verses 22–23

Verse 26

"To you first": The offer of blessing from God is universal, but is first offered to the people of Israel; this is also Paul's message (cf. ).

See also
 Jerusalem
 John the Apostle 
 Simon Peter
 Solomon
 Related Bible parts: Genesis 22, Genesis 26, Genesis 28, Deuteronomy 18, Acts 2

References

Sources

External links
 King James Bible - Wikisource
English Translation with Parallel Latin Vulgate
Online Bible at GospelHall.org (ESV, KJV, Darby, American Standard Version, Bible in Basic English)
Multiple bible versions at Bible Gateway (NKJV, NIV, NRSV etc.)

03